Tami Wiencek (born 1969) is a former member of the Iowa legislature, representing the 21st District in the Iowa House of Representatives from 2007 to 2009.

Wiencek served on several committees in the Iowa House - the Economic Growth, Education, and Ways and Means committees.  She also served on the Administration and Regulation Appropriations Subcommittee.

Wiencek was elected in 2006, defeating Democratic incumbent Don Shoultz, despite the fact that 2006 was a very favorable election year for Iowa Democrats.  However, she was defeated by Democrat Kerry Burt in the following 2008 elections.

Prior to her political career, she worked as a reporter/anchor on KWWL-TV in Waterloo.  In 2005, she worked for Beecher & Wiencek Public Relations, a public relations firm.

Electoral history
*incumbent

References

External links

 
Wiencek on Project Vote Smart
Wiencek's Capitol Web Address

1969 births
Living people
Politicians from Chicago
Politicians from Waterloo, Iowa
Drake University alumni
Republican Party members of the Iowa House of Representatives
Women state legislators in Iowa
Iowa television reporters
21st-century American women